Chandan Tiwari is an Indian folk singer from Bihar. She is known as folk singer and sings in Bhojpuri, Nagpuri, Awadhi and Hindi. She was awarded Sangeet Natak Academy-Bismillah Khan Samman. She was honoured by Bhojpuri Kokila in Kolkata. BAG Films-News 24 awarded her best traditional folk singer. She appeared in India Today Magazine in cover story for her contributions to Indian folk music. She has been singing in various forms of folks like Purabi Sohar, Pachra Gandhi song, River Song, Chhath Song Kajri and Thumri.

Early life 
Chandan Tiwari was born in Badka Gaon, Bhojpur district, Bihar, India. She was raised in Chas Bokaro, Jharkhand. She has completed BA Honours in Anthropology from Vinoba Bhave University, Hazaribagh. She also has Six year Prabhakar from Prayag Sangeet Samiti, Allahabad. She is doing research project on rare and rural Bhojpuri song for Maithili and Bhojpuri Academy, Govt of Delhi.

Career 
Chandan Tiwari is a Folk singer singing in Bhojpuri, maithili, Magahi, Awadhi, Nagpuri (especially in Bhojpuri language). She has done many special musical shows on Doordarshan including special shows on My Musical Effort and series like Purabiyataan & Nimiya chiraiyan ke baser. She had participated in Jila Top & Sur Sangram on Mahuaa T.V. She took part in ETV folk jalwa show. Along with Big Magic Ganga T.V. She has done many special shows of Bhakti Sagar.  With All India Radio Patna she has done Special Folk and Ghajal Recording shows. She has always stood in favour of participation of women and women empowerment in folk songs.

She has also done many musical series and interviews with many prestigious private F.M.radio channels. Like Radio Mirchi, Radio Dhoom, Radio Sanehi and mobile radio-Gramvani. Chandan Tiwari was selection Team member of Big Magic Ganga TV show Rang Purwaiya. Chandan Tiwari has been working in various forms of singing, festivals and on many different types of issues. She has always been against vulgarity in the music industry.

Performances 

      Bhoojal Bhaat Music fest- A folk fest organized by Netherland Indian society, held at Amsterdam
      Gandhi Sangeet Mahotsav, organized by Government of Bihar, held at Gyan Bhavan, Patna
      Bihar Diwas Samaroh, organized by Government of Bihar, held at SK Memorial Hall, Patna
      Bihar Mahotsav, organized by Government of Bihar, held at Goa
 Gandhi Sangeet Mahotsav, organized by Central University of Gujrat, held at Gandhinagar, Gujarat
      Biharnama, organized by Bihar Museum, held at Bihar Museum, Patna
 Gandhi Sangeet Sandhya, organized by Delhi Govt, held at Hindi Bhavan, Delhi
      Bhojpuri Mahotsav, organized by Madhya Pradesh Govt, held at Bharat Bhavan, Bhopal
      Kajari Mahotsav, organized by Madhya Pradesh Govt, held at Rewa (M.P.)
      Mahendar Misir Smriti Utsav, organized by Madhya Pradesh Govt, held at Sarani-Baitul (M.P) 
 Bihar Diwas Mahotsav, organized by Karnataka, held at Bengaluru
      Sanskritik Kumbh, organized by Government of Uttar Pradesh, held at Kumbh Mela, Uttarpradesh
      Folk Fest, organized by Mahatama Gandhi Antarrashtriya Vishwavidyalaya, held at wardha, Maharashtra
      Bihar Diwas Sangeet samaroh, organized by Government of Bihar, held at S.K.Memorial Hall, Patna
      Veer Kuwar Singh Sangeet Mahotsav, organized by Madhya Pradesh Govt, held at Itarasi
      Ek Sham Gandhi Ke name, organized by Adani Foundation, held at Book fair, Deoghar
      Itkhori Mahotsav, organized by Government of Jharkhand, held at Itkhori, Jharkhand
      Guru Samman Sangeet Mahotsav, organized by Prabhat Khabar, held at Daltonganj, Jharkhand
      Sur Sammad Mahotsav, organized by Darbhanga University, held at Darbhanga
      Gandhi Sangeet Mahotsav, organized by Govt of India, held at JNU, New Delhi
      Centenary year festival of B.H.U,Varanasi, held at Swatantrata Bhavan, B.H.U campus, Varanasi
      Ganhi jee- Gandhi Geet Mahotsav held at Mahatama Gandhi Anatrrashtriya Hindi Vishwavidyalaya, Wardha
      Lok Kala Sanskriti Mahotsav, Ghazipur (Uttarpradesh)
      Lok Rang Mahotsav, Kushinagar (Uttarpradesh)
      LokRasDhaar-River songs Fest organised by Vikas Bharati and held at Ranchi, Jharkhand
      Purabiyataan held at Premchand Rangshala, Patna
      Bhojpuri Mahotsav organised by Bhojpriya foundation, held at Vishakhapatnam
      SaajhiRaag-SaajhaRang, musical fest organised by Paridhi on the occasion of srijan mela and held at kala Kendra, Bhagalpur
      NOBA international meet musical evening, organised by Netarhat Old Boys association
Bhikhari Thakur Sangeet Mahotsav, organised by Akhil Vishwa Bhojpuri manch and held at Jamshedpur

Singing work 
Purabia Ustad, Beti Chiraiya Saman, Radha Rasiya, Sabake Ram (Rasool), Basanti Bayar, Shiv Jogia, Sajhi Raag, Sawani Bahar, Nirgunia Kabir, Ganhi Jee, Nadia Dheere Baho, Voice of Ganges, Maai, Chhathi Maiya, Rang kalasha, Charakhwa Chalu Rahe, Janta Geet, Jan Raag, Duniya Kayamba kisan se, Batohiya, Barah Masa, Kunwar Geet, Sohar-Mangal-Badhai, Suhag Raag, Chaita-Chaiti-Ghato, Bal Geet, Folk Lok.

Social musical works 

 Doing work on child folk songs and folk tales with children of Aanchal Shishu Ashram (An Orphanage)
 With Zuban Band (IIT Mumbai) preserving & promoting rare and pure folk.
 Nadi Geet series (Nadia Dhire Baho & Ganga maai..) with Ganga Jagran Abhiyan.
 In Process to develop a platform Named LOKRAAG for rural, new & forbidden artists, where they can explicitly express their ideas, notions & Skills about folk.

Awards 
 Bismillah Khan Samman Sangeet Natak Academi Award By Govt Of India
 Vindhyawasini Devi Bihar Kala Samman by Govt Of Bihar
 Bhojpuri Kokila Samman by Pashchim Bang Bhojpuri Parishad, Kolkata
 Best Traditional Folk Singer Award By News-24 & Radio Dhamal B.A.G Films
 Changemaker Icon of Bihar by Govt Of Bihar.
 Bahin-Bahinpa Samman, Sur Sammad, Darbhanga
 Acharya Lakshamikant Vajpeyee Samman, Munger
 Lok Ratna Samman, Gazhipur
 Aakhar Samman, Siwan
 Girija Devi Sangeet Samman, Balia
 Gandhi Sangeet Samman, Gandhi smriti darshan Samiti
 Bhikhari Thakur Samman, Jamshedpur
 Lok Ras Samman, Vikas Bharati, Ranchi
 Bhojpuria Ratna Samman, Bhopal

References

External links
 Facebook
 YouTube
 Instagram
 Twitter

Singers from Bihar
Living people
Indian women folk singers
Women musicians from Bihar
People from Bhojpur district, India
Year of birth missing (living people)
Hindi-language singers
Bhojpuri-language singers
Culture of Mithila
Culture of Bihar
Bhojpuri-language culture
21st-century Indian singers
21st-century Indian women singers